This is a list of former employees of the professional wrestling promotion Wrestling Society X. Wrestling Society X was founded in 2007. All wrestlers listed competed in the original incarnation of WSX.

Alumni

Male wrestlers

Female wrestlers

Managers
El Jefé
Johnny Webb
Lizzy Valentine
Nic Grimes
Sakoda

Stables and Tag Teams
Alkatrazz & Luke Hawx
Arik Cannon & Vic Grimes, with Nic Grimes
The Cartel (Delikado, Lil’ Cholo & Mongol) with El Jefé
Do It For Her (Jimmy Jacobs & Tyler Black)
The Filth and The Fury (Teddy Hart & Matt Cross)
Keepin’ It Gangsta (Ruckus & Babi Slymm)
Los Pochos Guapos (Aaron Aguilera & Kaos)
Team Dragon Gate (Horiguchi & Yoshino) with Sakoda
That 70's Team (Joey Ryan & The Disco Machine)
The Trailer Park Boyz (Nate Webb & Josh Raymond) with Johnny Webb

Broadcast Team
Fabian Kaelin – ring announcer, co-host of WSXtra
Kris Kloss – play-by-play analyst
Lacey – interviewer/correspondent, co-host of WSXtra

Referees
Danny Ramirez
John Moore
Patrick Hernandez
Rick Knox

See also
 Wrestling Society X

References

External links 
 Wrestling Society X – Cagematch.net

Wrestling Society X
Global Force Wrestling alumni